Aayushi Dholakia is an Indian beauty queen, who was crowned as Miss Teen International 2019 on 19 December 2019 in New Delhi, India. She is the first Indian to win the title of Miss Teen International.
Actresses in Gujarati cinema

Pageantry

Miss Teen India 2019 
Aayushi competed in the Miss Teen India 2019 competition owned by Glamanand held at the JaiBagh Palace, Jaipur on 30 September 2019 where she was crowned Miss Teen International 2019 by outgoing queen, Ritika Khatnani. During the competition she also bagged several sub-awards including Miss Congeniality, Miss Environment and Miss Beauty with Cause.

Miss Teen International 2019 
Aayushi represented India in the Miss Teen International 2019 pageant held at the New Delhi, India where she was crowned Miss Teen International 2019 by outgoing queen Odalys Duarte of Mexico. Competing against 20 other contestants from around the globe, Aayushi became the first Indian to win the Miss Teen International crown in the pageants 27-year history. During the final question and answer portion, all the contestants were asked different questions by the host: "Do you believe that when the entire world had just an international federal government with no split nation, then globe might have already been a significantly better destination?",

References

External links 

2003 births
Female models from Gujarat
Beauty pageant contestants from India
Indian beauty pageant winners
Living people